The Conservative Party of South Carolina was a political party of South Carolina during Reconstruction. It was founded in 1874 by James Chestnut from the State Tax Union to provide an organization for the mobilization of white voters. The absence of an active and statewide Democratic Party led many Democrats to become members of the Conservative Party for the election of 1874. The reemergence of a strong Democratic Party for the election of 1876 ended the Conservative Party.

A convention in Columbia for the State Tax Union was summoned for September 10, 1874, by James Chestnut. The purpose of the convention was to plan for the election of 1874 and to dispute a statement by President Grant on September 2 about the recent activities of the Ku Klux Klan (KKK) in the South.

Chestnut called for another convention of the State Tax Union to be held on October 8 in Columbia to discuss election strategies and choose candidates for office. The delegates agreed to support the Independent Republican statewide ticket and adopted a platform of honesty and efficiency in state government.

The Independent Republican statewide candidates were all defeated for the general election on November 3, 1874. However, the Conservatives did reduce the majorities of the Republicans in the House and the Senate, albeit modestly. A fusion of the Conservative and Independent Republican parties in Charleston County enabled Conservatives to be elected to the General Assembly from Charleston and for the Independent Republican Edmund W.M. Mackey to win a seat in Congress from the Second District.

While unable to achieve its electoral goals in the election, the lasting effect of the Conservative Party was to provide a basis for the reformation of the Democratic Party. The failure of the Conservatives caused the Democrats to believe that in order to gain control of state government, they needed to nominate a full slate of statewide candidates for the election of 1876.

References

Political parties established in 1874
Defunct state and local conservative parties in the United States
History of South Carolina
Regional and state political parties in the United States
Reconstruction Era
Political parties in South Carolina
1874 establishments in South Carolina